Skolimowski (feminine Skolimowska) is a Polish surname. It may refer to:

 Henryk Skolimowski (1930–2018), Polish philosopher
 Jerzy Skolimowski (born 1938), Polish film director
 Jerzy Skolimowski (1907–1985), Polish rowing coxswain
 Kamila Skolimowska (1982–2009), Polish hammer thrower
 Robert Skolimowski (born 1956), Polish weightlifter

Polish-language surnames